Kayapa can refer to:

 Kayapa
 Kayapa, Büyükorhan
 Kayapa, Edirne